King Lam Estate is a mixed TPS and public housing estate in Tseung Kwan O, New Territories, Hong Kong near MTR Po Lam station. It is the third public housing estate in Tseung Kwan O and has a total of seven residential blocks built in 1990. Some of the flats were sold to tenants through Tenants Purchase Scheme Phase 4 in 2001.

Ho Ming Court is a Home Ownership Scheme housing court in Tseung Kwan O near King Lam Estate. It has only one residential block built in 1990.

Houses

King Lam Estate

Ho Ming Court

Demographics
According to the 2016 by-census, King Lam Estate had a population of 14,367. The median age was 52 and the majority of residents (98.2 per cent) were of Chinese ethnicity. The average household size was 2.8 people. The median monthly household income of all households (i.e. including both economically active and inactive households) was HK$26,000.

Politics
King Lam Estate and Ho Ming Court are located in King Lam constituency of the Sai Kung District Council. It was formerly represented by Cheung Wai-chiu, who was elected in the 2019 elections until July 2021.

See also

Public housing estates in Tseung Kwan O

References

Po Lam
Tseung Kwan O
Public housing estates in Hong Kong
Tenants Purchase Scheme
Residential buildings completed in 1990